Santi Pietro e Cesareo is a Roman Catholic church located outside of the town of Guardea, in the frazione calle Piano Antico, in the province of Terni, region of Umbria, Italy.

History
The parish church is located in Piazza Pietro Panfili. In the early 1700s, this church replaced an earlier structure dedicated to Santa Cecilia. The present church has a single nave with three side chapels. The apse was frescoed in the 19th century by Andrea Galeotti, replicating a design from a church in the neighborhood of Tenaglie (town of Montecchio). Among the canvases in the church is the main altarpiece depicting a Last Supper by a follower of Livio Agresti.

References

Churches in the province of Terni
18th-century Roman Catholic church buildings in Italy